Canadian Airways Congo (alternatively known as Canair Congo) is a Congolese passenger airline company. It was established in 2004. The airline's hub is Maya-Maya Airport, in Brazzaville.

The airline is on the list of airlines banned within the European Union, as are all Congolese airlines.

Fleet

Current fleet
The Canadian Airways Congo fleet consists of the following aircraft (as of August 2019):

Former fleet
The airline previously operated the following aircraft:
 1 Boeing 737-500

Accidents and incidents
On Friday, January 25, 2008, a Boeing 727-247 that Canadian Airways Congo had leased from Teebah Airlines was damaged after an Antonov AN-12 ran into it as it was parked. The 727 was written off after the accident, which happened at Pointe Noire Airport, Pointe Noire, Congo. There were no occupants inside the Boeing 727, and no fatalities on the Antonov airplane. The Boeing 727 was wearing basic Iraqi Airways livery with Canadian Airways Congo titles when the accident took place.

See also
Air Zaïre (formerly Air Congo)

References

External links

2004 establishments in the Republic of the Congo
Airlines established in 2004
Airlines of the Republic of the Congo
Organisations based in Brazzaville